Villapourçon is a commune in the Nièvre department in central France.

Demographics
On 1 January 2019, the estimated population was 407.

See also
Communes of the Nièvre department
Parc naturel régional du Morvan

References

Communes of Nièvre